Kenan Bajramović (born May 24, 1981) is a Bosnian professional basketball player who last played for Spars Sarajevo of the Bosnian League.

Professional career
Bajramović spent the early part of his career in his native Bosnia and Herzegovina between his original club, Čelik Zenica and Bosna Sarajevo, with whom he won the national title and cup in 2005.

From 2005 to 2007 he played with the Ukrainian team Azovmash Mariupol. With them he was a two time champion of the Ukrainian SuperLeague. For the 2007–08 season he moved to Lietuvos rytas.

In June 2008, he signed a two-year deal with the Ukrainian team BC Kyiv. In February 2009, Kyiv released him. Later that month he signed with Türk Telekom of Turkey for the remainder of the season.

In August 2009, he signed a one-year deal with the German team ALBA Berlin. In December 2009, Alba released him. In January 2010, he signed with his former team Lietuvos rytas for the remainder of the season. With them he won the Lithuanian League in the 2009–10 season. He later re-signed with Rytas for one more season.

In August 2011, he signed a one-year deal with the Turkish team Banvit. In August 2012, he re-signed with Banvit for one more season.

In October 2013, he signed with the Latvian team VEF Rīga. In January 2014, he parted ways with Rīga. On January 22, 2014, he returned to Bosnia and signed with OKK Spars Sarajevo. However he played only one game with Spars, and on February 1, 2014, he signed with Beşiktaş İntegral Forex of Turkey for the rest of the season. On October 25, 2014, he extended his contract with Beşiktaş until the end of season.

On September 3, 2015, he signed with OKK Spars Sarajevo. On February 19, 2016, he left Spars and signed for the rest of the season with Socar Petkim of the Turkish Basketball First League. On August 12, 2016, Bajramović signed with French club Cholet Basket for the 2016–17 season. On November 8, 2016, he left Cholet and signed with OKK Spars Sarajevo. In November 2017, Bajramović signed with Turkish club Akhisar Belediyespor.

In January 2019, Bajramović signed for Spars Sarajevo for the rest of the 2018–19 season. It's his fourth stint with the Spars.

Euroleague career statistics

|-
| style="text-align:left;"| 2007–08
| style="text-align:left;"| Lietuvos rytas 
| 19 || 6 || 24.5 || .500 || .421 || .759 || 5.7 || .8 || .6 || .4 || 11.1 || 11.4
|-
| style="text-align:left;"| 2010–11
| style="text-align:left;"| Lietuvos rytas
| 14 || 6 || 26.1 || .465 || .233 || .766 || 5.2 || 1.4 || .6 || .2 || 11.4 || 10.4

Bosnian national team
Bajramović is a long time member of the Bosnia and Herzegovina national basketball team. He played with them at the three European Championships (2003, 2005 and 2011).

References

External links
Euroleague.net profile
FIBA.com profile
TBLStat.net profile

1981 births
Living people
ABA League players
Alba Berlin players
Bandırma B.İ.K. players
BC Azovmash players
BC Kyiv players
BC Rytas players
Beşiktaş men's basketball players
BK VEF Rīga players
Bosnia and Herzegovina men's basketball players
Cholet Basket players
OKK Spars players
Petkim Spor players
Power forwards (basketball)
Sportspeople from Zenica
Türk Telekom B.K. players